Perizoma is a genus in the geometer moth family (Geometridae). It is the type genus of tribe Perizomini in subfamily Larentiinae. The tribe is considered monotypic by those who include the genera Gagitodes, Martania and Mesotype in Perizoma. Some other less closely related species formerly placed here are now elsewhere in the Larentiinae, e.g. in Entephria of the tribe Larentiini.

Either way, there are more than 150 species of Perizoma currently known, with a generally Northern Hemisphere distribution (e.g. 14 occurring in Europe), and new ones still being described occasionally. Many of them are called rivulets ("the" rivulet is P. affinitata specifically), while others are known as carpets, a common name for Larentiinae in general.

It was first described by Jacob Hübner in 1825. One of its junior synonyms is Emmelesia, proposed by James Francis Stephens no less than three times – once validly in 1829, and within the next two years twice more invalidly, covering a total of 18 species. Another invalid name of Perizoma – Opisogonia, chosen by Gottlieb August Wilhelm Herrich-Schäffer in 1856 – had already been used by the same author the year before for a different geometer moth genus.

Selected species
Species of Perizoma include:

Footnotes

References
  (2011): Perizoma. Version 2.4, January 27, 2011. Retrieved April 21, 2011.
  (2004a): Butterflies and Moths of the World, Generic Names and their Type-species – Opisogonia Herrich-Schäffer, 1855. Version of November 5, 2004. April 21, Retrieved 2011.
  (2004b): Butterflies and Moths of the World, Generic Names and their Type-species – Perizoma. Version of November 5, 2004. Retrieved April 21, 2011.
  (2004c): Butterflies and Moths of the World, Generic Names and their Type-species – Zerynthia Curtis, 1830. Version of November 5, 2004. Retrieved April 21, 2011.